Rabbi Einhorn may refer to:
David Einhorn (rabbi), a leader of the Jewish reformation movement in the US during the 19th century
Ephraim Einhorn (1918–2021), a rabbi in Taiwan